Minneapolis is the largest city in the U.S. state of Minnesota and the county seat of Hennepin County. As of the 2020 Census, the population of Minneapolis was 429,954.

Population and age

The population of Minneapolis has declined since its peak of 521,718 in 1950, with a small rebound between the periods of 1990 to 2000 and 2000 to 2010. The U.S. Census Bureau reported 382,578 in 2010, down from 382,618 in the 2000 Census. In contrast, the Minneapolis–Saint Paul metropolitan area including the suburbs doubled in population since 1950 and now has approximately 3.5 million residents.

In 1950, approximately 70.0% of the metropolitan area's population was concentrated in the two core cities of Minneapolis and its twin city, St. Paul, Minnesota. By 2010, the two cities held only 20.0% of the metropolitan area total population. Increased housing production such as the construction of condominiums has brought Downtown Minneapolis' population to a little over 30,000 inhabitants.

According to the 2010 Census, conducted by the U.S. Census Bureau, the age distribution was as follows.
 Under 5 years: 7.3%
 5–9 years: 5.4%
 10–14 years: 4.9%
 15–19 years: 7.0%
 20–24 years: 9.7%
 25–34 years: 18.2%
 35–44 years: 15.9%
 45–54 years: 14.1%
 55–59 years: 5.4%
 60–64 years: 3.7%
 65–74 years: 3.9%
 75–84 years: 3.0%
 85 years and over: 1.6%
 Median age: 33.7 years

Race and ethnicity

As of the 2020 Census, the racial composition was 58.1% non-Hispanic White, 18.9% Black or African American, 10.4% Hispanic or Latino, 5.8% Asian or Native Hawaiian/Pacific Islander, 1.2% American Indian, and 0.5% some other race. 5.24% were of two or more races.

From the 19th century until about 1950, Minneapolis hovered around 99.0% white. As of the 2000 Census, non-Hispanic whites represented 62.5% of Minneapolis's population. Since the 1950s, the city has been diversifying. Immigrants from countries such as Somalia, Ethiopia, Vietnam, Laos, and Cambodia have brought Minneapolis a more ethnically diverse population. However, out of the nation's 100 largest cities, Minneapolis is one of seventeen cities in which the trend of white demographic decline has halted or even reversed. According to the recent 2021 estimates, non-Hispanic whites now represent 61.1% of Minneapolis's population, up from the 2020 census figure of 58.1%. 

Blacks settled in the region as early as the late 19th century after the American Civil War when northern cities were seen as havens from the cultural politics of the South. However, blacks who did not gain mobility into the middle-class were concentrated in public housing ghettos. This resulted in a lawsuit in the 1990s and public housing was subsequently dispersed in the metropolitan area. After the 1960s when much of the white flight occurred, the black population largely settled on the north side of Minneapolis.

Asians historically did not have a significant presence, but there are roughly 17,700 Asians in Minneapolis today, and their influence is growing. Their history began with labor workers working on railroads in the late 19th century who resettled in Minneapolis. These were mostly southern Chinese and in time brought families and others seeking fortune. The 20th century saw movement from other parts of East Asia including Hong Kong, Taiwan, Japan, and Korea. U.S. events in that region resulted in a greater influx of these populations, though Minneapolis only saw a small portion of the immigration, as most of these immigrants settled in California. Chinese dominated the group until the Vietnam War and its aftermath generated a large refugee migration of Southeast Asians into South Minneapolis in the 1970s. The Hmong nomadic clans were offered settlement and though the largest center of Hmong people is in St. Paul, a significant share settled in Minneapolis. As a result, the 2000 Census reported 13,883 people who marked "Other Asian" in the tic box, half of the Asian American group, while Chinese numbered at 2,447 people. As of the 2006–08 American Community Survey, there are 8,315 who were of the "Other Asian" group and there were 2,925 Chinese Americans residing in Minneapolis.

A large number of the Somali immigrants settled in Minneapolis, which in 2002 harbored the largest population of Somalis in North America. According to 2010 American Community Survey data, there were approximately 85,700 people with Somali ancestry in the US. Of those, about 25,000 or one third were living in Minnesota.

There is a growing Mexican population in South and Northeast Minneapolis.

Languages

78.8% of the population speaks only English at home. Other languages spoken include Spanish (7.1%), Somali (3.7%), Hmong (2.2%), and Vietnamese (1.5%). Other languages spoken by smaller percentages of the population include Oromo, Russian, Amharic, Chinese, and French. 8.4% speak English less than "very well". These statistics are based on self-reported language use and may not capture all the languages spoken in Minneapolis.

Nativity

14.8% of Minneapolis residents were not born in the United States.

Households and families
According to the 2005-2007 American Community Survey, there were a total of 155,155 households, out of which 45.3% were family households and 54.7% were non-family households. Of the family households, 21.9% had children under the age of 18 living in them while 29.1% were married couples. In addition, 4.8% of family households were made up of a male householder with no wife present and 11.4% were made up of a female householder with no husband present. Non-family households were 54.7% of all households. Of the non-family households, 42.7% were made up of a householder living alone and 7.4% were made up of a householder living alone who was 65 years of age and over. The average household size was 2.22 and the average family size was 3.11.

Income, employment and disparity
After the recent boom of the 1990s, Minneapolis still lags behind its suburban counterparts in terms of income and employment. Job growth was double in suburban areas and with it, the labor force is growing faster outside the city. Though city wages are exceeding regional jobs, most of the increases are in the downtown area and in corporate industries where employees may not necessarily live inside the city. When downtown is excluded from the statistics, Minneapolis' neighborhood wages are 92.0% of their suburban counterparts. Neighborhoods have gained 5,300 jobs since 1996 but the industry makeup has changed with stable manufacturing and trade jobs losing the most in favor of education, health and service jobs.

Though jobs are leaving the city, Minneapolis has a highly educated work force. The share of adults in the labor force was 70.0% and the recorded low unemployment rate was 4.7% in 2002. However, racial and ethnic minorities lag behind White counterparts with 15.0% of African Americans and 13.0% of Hispanics holding bachelor's degrees, compared to 42.0% of European Americans. About 15.8% of families and 21.5% of the population were below the poverty line, including 33.1% of those under age 18 and 12.4% of those aged 65 or over.

Regionally, the population is continuing to decentralize away from Minneapolis, relocating families and middle to upper income brackets outside the city. Growth in the middle class has been slow with the 2000 median household income at $37,974 and the median family income at $48,602. However, the median household income now stands at $44,478 and the median family income now stands at $59,816.

Religion
According to a 2014 study by the Pew Research Center, 70% of the population of the Minneapolis metro area identified themselves as Christians, with 46% professing attendance at a variety of churches that could be considered Protestant, and 21% professing Roman Catholic beliefs. while 23% claim no religious affiliation. The same study says that other religions (including Judaism, Buddhism, Islam, and Hinduism) collectively make up about 5% of the population.

31% of residents attend religious service at least once a week, 33% attend at least a few times a year, and 36% do only seldom or never at all. 42% pray at least daily. 69% believe in Heaven, and 51% believe in Hell.

References

https://web.archive.org/web/20080517042659/http://www.theus50.com/minnesota/history.shtml

Demographics
Culture of Minneapolis
Economy of Minneapolis
Minneapolis